Kiss and Tell is a Vancouver, British Columbia based performance and artist collective whose work is concerned with lesbian sexuality. In 1990, collective members Persimmon Blackbridge, Lizard Jones and Susan Stewart used the intense debates within the queer community around sexual practice in the early 1990s to create the photographic exhibition Drawing the Line. Their photographs depicted a continuum of lesbian sexual practice ranging from kissing to whipping, bondage, and voyeurism. The project encouraged gallery viewers to comment on what they saw and how it made them feel by writing directly on the walls around the prints; allowing the viewer to "draw the line" and examine their ideas and beliefs about different sexual behaviors. “Drawing the Line” was made in response to the “porn wars” of the late 80’s-the feminist debate of if female sexual imagery was more oppressive to women, or if it was empowering to women. Kiss and Tell’s work explicitly embraced depictions of female sexuality, and encouraged the conversation between anti-porn feminists and sex positive feminists. The art was controversial, even more so as it was released in the era of the Red Hot Video Store bombings. The collective displayed their work to point out the double standard in which artists exploring politics and sexuality are “cause for alarm” and yet adult films and magazines that are much more explicit are of no concern. The show traveled widely in Canada and the United States in the 1990s, as well as showing in Australia and the Netherlands. In the summer of 2015 Kiss and Tell had redisplayed and revisited their exhibition “Drawing the Line.” This was featured at the Vancouver Queer Arts Festival in celebration of the work’s 25th anniversary, and was the first time in 13 years that it had been displayed.

Group member Lizard Jones remembers the impact of the show in her community of Vancouver, and beyond: "There was/is a lot to say, and a lot to learn from audiences at our talks. Our first performance piece... True Inversions, evolved quite directly from those experiences, from a desire to say things that were non-verbal, visual, or more emotive, things that had no place in talks".

True Inversions was a multi-media performance that caused a similar stir across the country, and resulted in the book, Her Tongue on my Theory: Images, Essays and Fantasies which won a Lambda Award in 1995.  Their book Her Tongue on My Theory had a good reception and went on to be nominated for Lambda Literary Awards in the categories of Lesbian Studies Award, Small Press Book Award, and the Lesbian Poetry Award. They had won the Small Press Book Award. Lorna Boschman directed three videos about Kiss & Tell: Drawing the Line (1992), True Inversions (1992), and Before the New Millennium (2007).

Kiss and Tell premiered That Long Distance Feeling: Perverts, Politics & Prozac in Vancouver in November 1997.

Artist biographies
 Persimmon Blackbridge is a visual artist and writer whose work has focused on lesbian sex and sexual representation, disability culture, and the mental illness system. It is also worth mentioning that Persimmon Blackbridge has since been the winner of a 1991 VIVA award, a 1995 Lambda Award, a Ferro Grumley Fiction Prize in 1997, the 1998 Van City Book Award, and an Emily Carr Distinguished Alumni Award in 2000.
 Lizard Jones is a visual artist, award-winning writer, and performer living in Vancouver, with experience in radio and alternative print media. Her novel, Two Ends of Sleep, was published by Press Gang Publishers in 1997.
 Susan Stewart has been producing photography and multi-media performance works since 1978. She also teaches and has an M.F.A. from Simon Fraser University. Her most recent work, "Lovers & Warriors: aural/photographic collaborations," was an installation produced in collaboration with 25 women, mostly lesbians, which explores issues of gender, marginality, and the politics of photographic representation.

Bibliography
 Kiss & Tell Drawing The Line: Lesbian Sexual Politics on the Wall. Vancouver, B.C.: Press Gang Publishers, 1991.
 Kiss & Tell (Persimmon Blackbridge, Lizard Jones, and Susan Stewart). Her Tongue on My Theory: Images, Essays and Fantasies. Vancouver, B.C.: Press Gang Publishers, 1994.
 Blackbridge, Persimmon and Sheila Gilhooly. Still Sane. Vancouver, B.C.: Press Gang Publishers, 1985.
 Blackbridge, Persimmon. Sunnybrook: A True Story With Lies. Vancouver, B.C.: Press Gang Publishers, 1996.

References

External links 
Records of the Kiss and Tell collective are held by Simon Fraser University's Special Collections and Rare Books

Feminism in British Columbia
Feminist organizations in Canada
Canadian lesbian artists
Lesbian culture in Canada
LGBT culture in Vancouver
Canadian artist groups and collectives
LGBT organizations in Canada
LGBT art in Canada
Lambda Literary Award winners